Tetrafucol A is a fucol-type phlorotannin found in the brown algae Ascophyllum nodosum, Analipus japonicus and Scytothamnus australis.

In A. japonicus, 5'-bromo- and 5'-chlorotetrafucol-A can also be detected.

References 

Phlorotannins
Natural phenol tetramers